Ushana, until 1990 known as "Batpakkol", is a village in the Karatobe District, West Kazakhstan Region, Kazakhstan. It is part of the Sulykol Rural District (KATO code - 275049500). Population:

Geography
Ushana is located by the Kaldygaity river, east of Tolen village.

References

Populated places in West Kazakhstan Region